Raffaello del Brescianino or Dei Piccinelli was an Italian painter of the Renaissance period, active in Siena. Together with his brother Andrea, they were known as the Brescianini of Siena. He was the son of a dancing-master at Siena, where he flourished from 1507 to 1525. He was the pupil of a Sienese painter, named Giovan Battista Giusi, and they together painted an altar-piece, representing the 'Virgin and Child, with Saints,' which is in the Siena Academy, and in 1524 the 'Baptism of Christ,' for the baptistery of the cathedral of the same city. In 1525 the brothers went to Florence, and in the same year Andrea, and probably Raffaello also, was registered in the Painters' Guild. The brothers appear to have worked under the influence of Fra Bartolommeo. Raffaello died at Florence in 1545.

References

 

Year of birth unknown
1545 deaths
Italian Renaissance painters
16th-century Italian painters
Italian male painters
Painters from Siena
Painters from Florence